Hemigrapsus is a genus of varunid crabs comprising thirteen species native almost exclusively in the Pacific Ocean, but two have been introduced to the North Atlantic region.

Biogeography
The natural range of the genus is restricted to the Pacific Ocean, except for Hemigrapsus affinis which lives along the Atlantic coasts of South America, from Cape São Roque (Rio Grande do Norte state, Brazil) to the San Matías Gulf, (Patagonia, Argentina). H. estellinensis is almost certainly extinct, but was endemic to a hypersaline spring in the Texas Panhandle,  from the sea. Populations of Hemigrapsus sanguineus have been introduced from the species' native range in East Asia to several places, and now range along the Atlantic coast of North American from Portland, Maine to North Carolina, along the West European coast from northern Spain to Denmark, and in the northern Adriatic Sea and northern Black Sea. H. takanoi is native to East Asia, but has been introduced to western Europe, now extending from northern Spain to Denmark, including the westernmost Baltic Sea area.

Species
Fifteen species are currently recognised:

Hemigrapsus affinis Dana, 1851
Hemigrapsus crassimanus Dana, 1851
Hemigrapsus crenulatus (H. Milne-Edwards, 1837)
†Hemigrapsus estellinensis Creel, 1964
Hemigrapsus gibbus (Hombron & Jacquinot, 1846)
Hemigrapsus longitarsus (Miers, 1879)
Hemigrapsus nudus (Dana, 1851)
Hemigrapsus octodentatus (H. Milne-Edwards, 1837)
Hemigrapsus oregonensis (Dana, 1851)
Hemigrapsus pallipes (H. Milne-Edwards, 1837)
Hemigrapsus penicillatus (De Haan, 1835)
Hemigrapsus sanguineus (De Haan, 1835)
Hemigrapsus sexdentatus (H. Milne-Edwards, 1837)
Hemigrapsus sinensis Rathbun, 1931
Hemigrapsus takanoi Asakura & Watanabe, 2005

References

External links

Grapsoidea
Decapod genera
Taxa named by James Dwight Dana